2005 saw the release of many sequels and prequels in video games, such as Grand Theft Auto: Liberty City Stories, Tony Hawk's American Wasteland, Resident Evil 4, Brothers in Arms: Road to Hill 30, Devil May Cry 3: Dante's Awakening, Mario Kart DS, Mario & Luigi: Partners in Time, Need for Speed: Most Wanted, and Prince of Persia: The Two Thrones, alongside prominent new releases including Brain Age, F.E.A.R., Forza Motorsport, God of War, Guitar Hero, Nintendogs, Shadow of the Colossus, and Sniper Elite. The seventh generation of video game consoles also began with the launch of the Xbox 360, while the Nintendo DS launched in PAL regions.

The year's best-selling video game worldwide was Gran Turismo 4 for the PlayStation 2. The year's most critically acclaimed title was Resident Evil 4 for the GameCube and PlayStation 2.

Critically acclaimed titles
Metacritic (MC) and GameRankings (GR) are aggregators of video game journalism reviews.

Trends
In 2005, the total U.S. sales of video game hardware, software and accessories rose 6% over 2004 to $10.5 billion USD ($9.9 billion, 2004) breaking 2002's $10.3 billion record for the industry.

The increase is largely due to the portable game market which counterbalanced sluggish console game sales. Delays, hardware shortages, and anticipation of next-generation video game consoles have been cited as reasoning for slow sales for both console games and console hardware. Console games and hardware dropped by 12% and 3% respectively.

The portable market of the video game industry rose to $1.4 billion, the second time sales broke the $1 billion mark in the industry's history. Mostly due to the release of the Nintendo DS and the PlayStation Portable in North America, sales for portable hardware rose 96% over 2004. Although the release of the Nintendo DS and the Sony PSP aided in spurring growth in the portable market, the Game Boy Advance still represented 62% total portable software units sold and 52% of total portable software dollar sales.

Computer games continued its trend and declined by 14%, dropping from $1.1 billion in 2004 to $953 million. Although sales did decrease, NPD claims that playing games on the PC is actually increasing through a variety of different mediums including online websites and MMO subscriptions.

Video game systems
PlayStation 2
Xbox
GameCube
Xbox 360

Additionally, Microsoft's Xbox 360, Sony's PlayStation 3 and Nintendo's Wii were officially unveiled during or just prior to E3; however, only the Xbox 360 was released in 2005. The Xbox 360 was released in North America on November 22, Europe on December 2, and Japan on December 10.

Handheld game systems
Game Boy Advance SP
Nintendo DS
PlayStation Portable

Additionally, the Game Boy Micro was unveiled and was released in the fall of 2005.

Best-selling video games

Japan

United States

PAL regions

Top game rentals in the United States

Events

Business

Notable releases

See also
2005 in games

Notes

References

 
Video games by year